Victoria Glendinning  (née Seebohm; born 23 April 1937) is a British biographer, critic, broadcaster and novelist. She is an Honorary Vice-President of English PEN and Vice-President of the Royal Society of Literature. She won the James Tait Black Memorial Prize and the Whitbread Prize for biography.

Early life and education 
She was born in Sheffield<ref>Niall Stanage, "Confessions of a storyteller" - interview with Victoria Glendinning, 'The Sunday Business Post, July 21, 2002  </ref> to a Quaker family. Her father was the banker Frederic Seebohm (created a life peer as Baron Seebohm in April 1972), while her great-grandfather was the economic historian, also called Frederic Seebohm. Her mother was clever, "but she never did anything with it, except wait for my father to come home".

Her sister is Caroline Seebohm, the American biographer.

Glendinning grew up near York and after attending Millfield School in Somerset, went up to Somerville College, Oxford to study modern languages.

Awards and honours
She is the only person to have won the Whitbread Prize (now the Costa Book Award) for biography twice, for her works on Vita Sackville-West (1983) and Anthony Trollope (1992). She won the James Tait Black Memorial Prize in 1981 for her biography of Edith Sitwell.

She was appointed CBE in 1998. She was awarded an honorary doctorate by Trinity College Dublin in 1995 and by the University of York in 2000.

Marriages and children
In the second year of her degree, she  married one of her Spanish lecturers, Nigel Glendinning in 1958. They divorced in 1981. Her second husband Terence de Vere White, father of Dervla Murphy's only child, died of Parkinson's disease in 1994. In 1996 she married Kevin O'Sullivan, who had previously been married to Shirley Conran. She had four sons before she was 28: sportswriter Matthew Glendinning, with whom she coauthored the book Sons and Mothers; mathematician Paul Glendinning; philosopher Simon Glendinning; and photographer and artist Hugo Glendinning. She sent her children to the local state school.

Selected publicationsA suppressed cry : life and death of a Quaker daughter, 1969, Routledge & Kegan PaulElizabeth Bowen: Portrait of a Writer, 1977, Weidenfeld & Nicolson (on Elizabeth Bowen)Edith Sitwell: A Unicorn Among Lions, 1981, Weidenfeld & Nicolson (on Edith Sitwell)Vita: The Life of V. Sackville-West, 1983, Weidenfeld & Nicolson (on Vita Sackville-West)Rebecca West: A Life, 1987, Weidenfeld & Nicolson (on Rebecca West)The Grown-Ups, 1989, Hutchinson (a novel set in the contemporary literary world)Trollope, 1992, Hutchinson (a biography of Anthony Trollope)Electricity, 1995, Hutchinson (a novel)Sons and Mothers, (co-editor with Matthew Glendinning) 1996, Virago, Jonathan Swift, 1998, Hutchinson (on Jonathan Swift)The Weekenders, (contributor),  2001, Ebury (from a short visit to Sudan)Flight, 2002, ScribnerLeonard Woolf: a biography, 2006, Simon & Schuster (on Leonard Woolf)Cousin Rosamund by Rebecca West (Victoria Glendinning wrote the Afterword)Love's Civil War: Elizabeth Bowen and Charles Ritchie: Letters and Diaries, 1941-1973, (co-editor with Judith Robertson) 2009, Simon & Schuster (on Elizabeth Bowen and Charles RitchieRaffles and the Golden Opportunity, 2012, Profile Books Ltd. (a biography of Stamford Raffles 1781-1826)The Butcher's Daughter, 2018, Duckworth Overlook (a novel centred on the dissolution of Shaftesbury Abbey in the 1530s)

Critical studies and reviews
 Review of Raffles and the golden opportunity''.

References

External links 
 British Council short biography

1937 births
Commanders of the Order of the British Empire
Fellows of the Royal Society of Literature
James Tait Black Memorial Prize recipients
Living people
People educated at Millfield
People educated at Heathfield School, Ascot
Presidents of the English Centre of PEN
Bloomsbury Group biographers
20th-century biographers
Writers from Sheffield
Daughters of life peers
Fellows of Somerville College, Oxford
Alumni of Somerville College, Oxford